Radial Road 2 (R-2), informally known as the R-2 Road, is a network of roads and bridges that all together form the second arterial road of Metro Manila in the Philippines.

Route description

Taft Avenue 

Between its northern terminus at the Lagusnilad underpass of Padre Burgos Avenue and Redemptorist Road in Pasay, R-2 is known as Taft Avenue. It serves the districts of Ermita and Malate running underneath the Manila Light Rail Transit System Line 1 (LRT-1) towards Parañaque via Pasay.

Elpidio Quirino Avenue 

Taft Avenue Extension merges with Elpidio Quirino Avenue at the intersection with Redemptorist Road near the Pasay–Parañaque border. This section of R-2 runs the entire length of Parañaque from Baclaran to San Dionisio.

Diego Cera Avenue 

R-2 is known as Diego Cera Avenue in Las Piñas. It runs between the Parañaque–Las Piñas boundary and Alabang–Zapote Road.

Aguinaldo Highway 

From Alabang–Zapote Road south to Tagaytay, R-2 is known as Aguinaldo Highway. It is the main north-south thoroughfare in the province of Cavite linking Las Piñas, Metro Manila with Cavite, particularly the cities and municipalities of Bacoor, Imus, Dasmariñas, Silang, and Tagaytay. R-2 ends at the Tagaytay Rotunda, providing the famous view of the Taal Lake.

Notes

References 

Routes in Metro Manila